The Teatro de la Cruz was, during its nearly 200-year existence, the principal theater for comedy in Madrid.

History
Founded by the Hermandad de la Soledad in 1584, it soon became the premier venue of its time for Spanish comedy.

In 1743, it was extensively renovated under the direction of the architect Pedro de Ribera, who transformed it into a modern theater seating 1500 spectators.

During the nineteenth century, Ribera's architectural style, and specifically the style embodied by the Teatro de la Cruz, came under intense official criticism; a Royal Order in 1849 officially declared the theater a "shame of art," and ordered it to be demolished forthwith. However, the demolition was not immediate; the theater reopened in 1850, only to be closed again between 1852 and 1857. Finally demolished in 1859, its existence is commemorated by a small plaque located at its former location, the intersection of Calle Espoz y Mina and Calle de la Cruz in central Madrid.

Several major works premiered on its stage, including El barón (1803), La mojigata (1804), and El sí de las niñas (1806) by Leandro Fernandez de Moratin, and Don Juan Tenorio (1844) by José Zorrilla.

External links
 Infos on "Madrid Histórico"
 Theatre's documentation

Entertainment venues in Madrid
Former theatres in Madrid
Corral de comedias